Jeffrey "Jeff" Sutphen (born October 15, 1976) is an American actor, producer, dancer and game show host known primarily for his work with Nickelodeon's BrainSurge from 2009 to 2011. From 2012 to 2013, he was the host of the show Figure It Out. He also has his own YouTube channel.

Personal life
Sutphen graduated with a Bachelor of Arts degree in communications from Marist College in Poughkeepsie, New York. He married his wife Stacy Sutphen on October 12, 2003. They live in Los Angeles and currently have one son and one daughter.

Career
Sutphen began his career in entertainment working for MTV. After switching to Nickelodeon, Sutphen worked as a producer for U-Pick Live, a show where viewers would pick what programs the network would air and on which he also portrayed superhero Pick Boy. The show aired from 2002 through 2005. After serving as a producer for Nickelodeon's 2008 game show My Family's Got Guts, Sutphen went on to host the network's 2009 game show BrainSurge.

At the 2010 Kids' Choice Awards, he and Lily Collins hosted the pre-award show The Countdown to Kids’ Choice! telecast live in Los Angeles.

He started hosting 101 Ways to Leave a Game Show for ABC in June 2011. On March 7, 2012 it was announced that Sutphen would be the new host of the classic Nickelodeon game show Figure It Out when it came back into production in April 2012.

Sutphen recently launched an internet-based talk show called The Garage Show with Jeff Sutphen. Sutphen invites guests to his garage where they talk about many different topics. On the second episode, former Nickelodeon game show hosts Marc Summers, Phil Moore and Kirk Fogg were guests.

As of 2019, Sutphen serves as a co-executive producer on Ryan's Mystery Playdate.

Filmography

Television

As a producer

References

External links

1977 births
Living people
American game show hosts
Television producers from New York (state)
American male television actors
Nickelodeon people
Marist College alumni
People from Fulton County, New York